Engineer Sheikh Abdul Rashid is a Kashmiri politician and a former Member of the Legislative Assembly in the erstwhile state of Jammu and Kashmir (MLA), Indian Administered Kashmir, from the Langate constituency in Handwara.  He is the founder and 'patron' of the Jammu and Kashmir Awami Ittehad Party.

Political career
Rashid started his political career in the year 2008 after resigning from his job as a construction Engineer. After a 17-day campaign he won the constituency seat of Langate in Handwara town in Kupwara district of Jammu and Kashmir.

Arrest
In the year 2005, Rashid was arrested by SOG in Srinagar for supporting militants subsequently jailed for three months and 17 days. A charge of anti-national activities was slapped on him. He was kept in Cargo, Humhama and Raj bagh prisons. Later Chief Judaical Magistrate Srinagar dropped all charges against him on humanitarian grounds. According to Rashid  he was arrested by motley group of counter-insurgents that worked closely with the State police and took him to an interrogation centre, where he was "interrogated." After five months of custody, he negotiated his release, paying up Rs. 3.0 lakhs by selling his cow,goats and father's property

Attacks
On 8 October 2015 Engineer Rashid was assaulted by BJP MLA's inside the Jammu and Kashmir assembly for hosting a party where he served beef on the lawns of the government circuit with a view to oppose the controversial central Government order banning the Beef in India.

He was also attacked with black ink in Press Club New Delhi by BJP cadets a day after his critical comments regarding the lynching of a Kashmiri truck driver in Udhampur.

References 

1967 births
Living people
Jammu and Kashmir MLAs 2014–2018
People from Kupwara district